Patrick Cottrell (born Patty Yumi Cottrell, 1981) is an American writer. He is the author of Sorry to Disrupt the Peace and the winner of a 2018 Whiting Award. He teaches at the University of Denver.

Biography 
Cottrell was born in South Korea in 1981 and was adopted, along with two biologically unrelated younger Korean boys, into a family from the Midwestern United States. He was raised in Pittsburgh, Chicago, and Milwaukee.

Cottrell started his first novel in his early thirties. In 2012 he received his M.F.A. from the School of the Art Institute of Chicago. After moving from New York to Los Angeles, he completed the novel in 2016. The resulting book, a "stylized contemporary noir" titled Sorry to Disrupt the Peace, was published by McSweeney's in 2017. Cottrell has called the book "an anti-memoir". It tells the story of Helen, a woman adopted from Korea at a young age, who returns to her adoptive parents' home in Milwaukee after her adoptive brother's suicide. Writing for The Rumpus, Liza St. James called the book "marvelously interior" and praised the writing as "discursive and associative and gripping all at once". The Guardian called the book "electrifying in its freshness" and the San Francisco Chronicle called it "a strange and lovely thing". Sorry to Disrupt the Peace won a National Gold Medal from the Independent Publisher Book Awards for Best First Book in the Fiction category. It also won Barnes & Noble’s 2017 Discover Award for Fiction.

In 2018 Cottrell received the Whiting Award in fiction, which is given to promising writers in the early stages of their careers. The selection committee said that his writing "opens up fresh lines of questioning in the old interrogations of identity".

Cottrell came out as transgender in 2021 and uses he/they pronouns.

Recognition 
2017: Barnes & Noble Discover Award
2017: National Gold Medal from the Independent Publisher Book Awards for Best First Book – Fiction
2018: Whiting Award

Bibliography

References 

1981 births
Living people
21st-century American novelists
School of the Art Institute of Chicago alumni
American writers of Korean descent
South Korean emigrants to the United States
South Korean adoptees
People from Milwaukee
American male novelists
21st-century male writers
Transgender writers
Transgender men
American LGBT people of Asian descent
21st-century American male writers